William Douglas Gairdner (born October 19, 1940, in Oakville, Ontario) is a retired track and field athlete who represented Canada in the men's 400 m hurdles and the men's decathlon at the 1964 Summer Olympics in Tokyo, Japan. He was awarded a silver medal in decathlon event at the 1963 Pan American Games in Brazil.

Gairdner attended Appleby College in Oakville, and is now a resident of Toronto. Following his hurdling career, he applied himself to the field of academia. He gained his first M.A. in 1967 (studying Structural Linguistics at Stanford University) and then earned a second one at the institution in 1969 in English Literature and Creative Writing. A year later he graduated with a Ph.D. in English Literature from Stanford. He is a published author and, among his works, BPS Books have published The Trouble with Canada, The Trouble with Democracy and Oh, Oh, Canada!.

Viewpoints
In an interview in the Michael Coren Show, Gairdner asserted that all modern Western democracies are "out of control" due to deficit spending and debts. He said that Canada is nearing a precipice with Canada's health care system, what he considers to be a "mistake", taking up more and more of the nation's government budget. He also said that he thinks anything produced by government, which he sees motivated by "power and size", will end up costing twice as much as anything made by the private sector.

Bibliography
 The Trouble with Canada: A Citizen Speaks Out (1990)
 The War Against Family: A Parent Speaks Out (1992)
 The Trouble with Democracy: A Citizen Speaks Out (2001)
 The Book of Absolutes: A Critique of Relativism and a Defence of Universals (2008)
 The Trouble with Canada... Still! : A Citizen Speaks Out (2011)
 The Great Divide: Why Liberals and Conservatives Will Never Agree (2015)

References

External links
 Canadian Olympic Committee
 William Gairdner Profile
 Profile of William Gairdner on BPS Books

1940 births
Living people
Athletes (track and field) at the 1963 Pan American Games
Athletes (track and field) at the 1964 Summer Olympics
Athletes (track and field) at the 1966 British Empire and Commonwealth Games
Athletes (track and field) at the 1970 British Commonwealth Games
Commonwealth Games competitors for Canada
Canadian decathletes
Canadian expatriates in the United States
Canadian male non-fiction writers
Canadian male hurdlers
Olympic track and field athletes of Canada
People from Oakville, Ontario
Stanford University alumni
Track and field athletes from Ontario
Writers from Ontario
Appleby College alumni
Pan American Games silver medalists for Canada
Pan American Games medalists in athletics (track and field)
Medalists at the 1963 Pan American Games